The Fino is a river in eastern central Italy. Its source is near Monte Camicia in the province of Teramo in the Abruzzo region of Italy. The river flows northeast and then curves east before flowing past Bisenti. It continues flowing eastward and crosses into the province of Pescara near Elice. The river flows southeast until it joins the Tavo river and the two rivers become the Saline river.

References

Rivers of the Province of Teramo
Rivers of the Province of Pescara
Rivers of Italy
Adriatic Italian coast basins